Raja Pemaisuri Bainun Bridge or Sungai Dinding Bridge is the fifth longest river bridge in Malaysia. It is located in Dinding River on Dinding Bypass (Federal Route 60) near Lumut, Manjung district, Perak. The bridge is 1.2 km (1.246 m) in length, of which 930 m is over Dinding River. Its 13 arches represent states in Malaysia and is decorated with lights that change from colour to colour.

History
Constructed began on 19 August 1997 by the Malaysian Public Works Department (JKR) and HMS Perunding Sdn Bhd. and was completed in 2000. It was officially opened on 30 April 2001 by the 34th Sultan of Perak, Almarhum Sultan Azlan Shah and the bridge was officially named Jambatan Raja Pemaisuri Bainun after Tuanku Bainun of Perak.

See also
Perak
Lumut

Bridges completed in 2000
Bridges in Perak